The following is a list of spin-offs of the 2002 100 Greatest Britons program produced by the BBC.



List by country or region

References

External links 
 Greatest People of the World
 Greatest Russian? Czar Nicholas leads vote
Ranking the Greatest People in History

 
BBC-related lists